A reverse walkthrough is a process in which the reader or consumer of a technical product takes the author through it.  A reverse walkthrough is a confirmation that the consumers of a technical product have the same understanding as the author of that product.  The author(s) ask questions about the content to confirm that the reader has understood it.  

This is common in software engineering for software reviews or use case/ business process reviews when the developer reads the source/use case/process back to the author.

The reverse walkthrough should be made when the consumers of the technical product have reviewed it and there is a risk that their understanding may not be reflective of the original intent.

Terms used here 
"Technical Product" here can refer to a workflow, software code, use case specification or diagram that is fairly complex.

Consumers of a technical product are those engineers that need to interpret the code, specification or diagram.

Objectives and participants 
A reverse walkthrough is meant to confirm a common understanding about the contents from consumers of a technical product.   

Often the author may ask, "what is meant by __" or "how will you implement this flow?".

A walkthrough is normally organized and directed by the author of the technical document.  Any combination of interested or technically qualified personnel (from within or outside the project) may be included, such as the Analyst, Designer, Architect, Developer and Quality Assurance engineers.

See also 
 Software walkthrough

Software review